The Maserati 8CM was a Grand Prix race car produced by Italian manufacturer  Maserati in Bologna between 1933 and 1935.

The car mounted an 8-cylinder 2991 cc straight engine and 400 mm drum brakes. Maximum power was around 220-240 hp at 5,500 rpm. The chassis had been derived from that of the 4CM 1100, which proved to be too light and was subject to flex; the situation improved when driver Tazio Nuvolari asked for a strengthening of the front part, and the weight reduced from 785 to 750 kg.

The car debuted at the Tunis Grand Prix in 1933 and also won the  1933 Belgian Grand Prix driven by Nuvolari. In 1934–1935, however, it struggled to match the pace of the Alfa Romeo, Mercedes and Auto Union, and was replaced by the V8RI model.

References

External links
Description and history page

8CM
Grand Prix cars